Attilio Stefanori (1860–1911) was an Italian painter, mainly working in watercolors and acquaforte etchings. He painted both landscapes, historic, and religious paintings.

Biography
He was born and a resident in Rome. He exhibits in 1883, in Rome, a watercolor depicting: Rebecca. In 1884 in Turin, Rachele and Cerberus; in 1887 at the National Artistic Exposition of Venice: Claudio Clan. At the 1905 Venice Biennale, he exhibited: I baci del mare, Paludi pontine, and Pineta di Castelfranco.

References

1860 births
1911 deaths
19th-century Italian painters
Italian male painters
20th-century Italian painters
Painters from Venice
19th-century Italian male artists
20th-century Italian male artists